Women's 100m races for blind & visually impaired athletes at the 2004 Summer Paralympics were held in the Athens Olympic Stadium. Events were held in three disability classes.

T11

The T11 event consisted of 3 heats, 2 semifinals and A & B finals. It was won by Ádria Santos, representing .

1st Round

Heat 1
19 Sept. 2004, 18:45

Heat 2
19 Sept. 2004, 18:51

Heat 3
19 Sept. 2004, 18:57

Semifinals
Heat 1
20 Sept. 2004, 11:20

Heat 2
20 Sept. 2004, 11:26

Final Round
Final A
20 Sept. 2004, 18:55

Final B
20 Sept. 2004, 18:45

T12

The T12 event consisted of 5 heats, 3 semifinals and A & B finals. It was won by Assia El Hannouni, representing .

1st Round

Heat 1
22 Sept. 2004, 11:55

Heat 2
22 Sept. 2004, 12:01

Heat 3
22 Sept. 2004, 12:07

Heat 4
22 Sept. 2004, 12:13

Heat 5
22 Sept. 2004, 12:19

Semifinals
Heat 1
23 Sept. 2004, 11:00

Heat 2
23 Sept. 2004, 11:06

Heat 3
23 Sept. 2004, 11:12

Final Round
Final A
24 Sept. 2004, 18:46

Final B
24 Sept. 2004, 18:40

T13

The T13 event consisted of a single race. It was won by Olga Semenova, representing .

Final Round
20 Sept. 2004, 18:30

References

W
2004 in women's athletics